Lees Whitehead (14 March 1864 – 22 November 1913) was an English first-class cricketer, who played in 119 games for Yorkshire County Cricket Club between 1889 and 1904.  He also appeared in fifteen games for the Marylebone Cricket Club (MCC) (1890-1903) and for Wembley Park (1896) and over 30 (1901) in first-class games.

Born in Birchen Bank, Friarmere near Saddleworth in Yorkshire, Whitehead appeared in a total of 136 first-class matches.  He scored 2,433 runs as a right-handed batsman, with a highest score of 67 not out against Somerset.  He took seventy nine catches in the field, and took 109 wickets with his right arm fast bowling, with a best return of 6 for 45 against the MCC, at an average of 25.67.  He took five  wickets in an innings on three occasions.  He stood as an umpire in at least three first-class, non-County Championship  matches towards the end of his playing career.

Whitehead later became a director of Hartlepool United F.C.

References

External links

1864 births
1913 deaths
Yorkshire cricketers
English cricket umpires
People from Saddleworth
People from West Hartlepool
Cricketers from County Durham
Sportspeople from Hartlepool
English cricketers
Marylebone Cricket Club cricketers
Over 30s v Under 30s cricketers
Sportspeople from Yorkshire
Wembley Park cricketers